Academy of Athens may refer to:
 Platonic Academy, founded by Plato in c. 387 BC
 Academy of Athens (modern), Greece's national academy, established in 1926

See also
 Athens Academy (school), a college preparatory school in Athens, Georgia, United States
 Athenian school (disambiguation)